DJ Disk is a turntablist from the San Francisco Bay Area. He is of Panamanian, Colombian, and Nicaraguan descent. Born Luis Quintanilla on October 7, 1970, in San Francisco, Disk began scratching and mixing vinyl at a young age. In 1992, he joined his long-time friend DJ Qbert among the Rock Steady Crew DJs, later changing the group's name to the Invisibl Skratch Piklz.

As a founding member of the Invisibl Skratch Piklz, Disk has been an enormously influential DJ and is credited with inventing the 2 Click Orbit, the echo fade technique and the 2 Click Flare Lazer Orbit techniques. He was later a founding member of El Stew, which, according to Allmusic, "dealt with the more experimental side of electronic music."

In addition to extensive hip hop work with the Piklz and others, Disk has collaborated with a wide variety of musicians working in other genres, including Herbie Hancock, Bill Laswell, Buckethead, Zakir Hussain, Mike Patton, Norah Jones, Flavor Flav, Rancid, Primus,  and Jack DeJohnette. He has been involved in over seventy recordings, and has performed in over fifteen countries. As of 2005, he teaches turntablism in San Francisco. DJ Disk originated the term "turntablist", to differentiate a DJ who plays a role in a band, using the turntable as a musical instrument, from a DJ who mixes and blends vinyl. (see competing claims).

Discography (partial) 
 1997: Marsupial's Belly Flop Breaks with Xtrakd (Scarecrow)
 1997: Transmutation Live by Praxis
 1998: Ancient Termites as PhonopsychographDISK
 1998: Devil Dub by Ben Wa
 1998: The Shiggar Fraggar Show! by Invisibl Skratch Piklz (five CDs and Videos)
 1999: Live @ Slim's / Turbulence Chest
 1999: No Hesitation by El Stew
 1999: The 13th Scroll by Cobra Strike
 2000: 149 Ways to Smash Paul Simon's Face Breaks (Stray)
 2001: PhonopsychographDISK Vs. The Filthy Ape: Mooch Moose (Stray)
 2001: Warszawa by Praxis
 2001: Live In San Francisco At Stern Grove by Tabla Beat Science
 2002: Live by Charged
 2002: Future 2 Future - Live by Herbie Hancock (DVD)
 2003: Talamanam Sound Clash by Tabla Beat Science
 2003: The Rehearsal by El Stew
 2006: Zurich by Praxis
 2006: Tornado Urine Breaks (Toolz)

Guest appearances 
 1995: ...And Out Come the Wolves by Rancid
 1998: Colma by Buckethead
 1998: Wave Twisters by DJ Qbert
 1999: Intonarumori by Material
 2001: Questside (Untold Tales) by DJ Quest
 2002: The Album by Latyrx
 2008: Profanation (Preparation for a Coming Darkness) by Praxis
 2008: Then And Now: The Definitive Herbie Hancock by Herbie Hancock

Compilations 
 1996: Altered Beats - Assassin Knowledges Of The Remanipulated (Axiom)
 1997: Valis II - Everything Must Go (Ion)
 1999: Planetary Natural Love Gas Webbin' 199999 - Mixed By DJ Pica Pica Pica (Comma)
 2000: Tektonics (OM Records)
 2001: Innerhythmic Sound System (Innerhytmic)
 2002: Scratch (Transparent Music)

References

External links 
 Official Homepage
 MySpace page

1970 births
Hip hop musicians from San Francisco
Living people
DJs from San Francisco